Podujevo, Podujeva or Besiana ( or Besianë), is a city and municipality in Pristina District in Kosovo.. According to the 2011 census, the city of Podujevo has 23,453 inhabitants, while the municipality has 88,499 inhabitants. The population of the city may be higher, as these figures include only the population of the cadastral zone of Podujevo, but not some urban neighborhoods of the city that are outside the cadastral zone.

Podujevo is located along a regional motorway and has railroad passing through it, which links the area to surrounding regions.

History

Middle Ages 
The region includes many Medieval Serbian monuments. In 1355, Emperor Stefan Dušan gave the village of Braina to Mount Athos. In 1381, Prince Lazar gave Orlane (a village in Podujeva) to his endowment, the Ravanica monastery. Ruins of old Serbian monasteries and churches exist at Orlane, Murgula (destroyed in the 15th century), Palatna, Slatina, Svetlje, Rakinica, Metohija (2), Donje Ljupce (destroyed in the 15th century), Gornja Pakastica (destroyed in the 15th century), Brevnik, Braina (3) and graveyards exist in most of these villages. The village of Brevnik had a notable medieval mine, and a fort with a church. Albanians are cited in the middle of the 14th century as miners and farmers while Albanian toponyms have been recorded in the area since the 15th century.

Ottoman period 
Podujevo remained under Ottoman Rule from 1455 to 1912. Podujevo was initially organized as a Nahije, and it was the largest one of Vushtrria. During the 15th to 18th centuries, Ottomans attempted to develop agriculture, farming, vineyards, beekeeping and handicrafts within the region. Mining activities were also present, especially in Bellasica, which was recognized as one of the most important mining areas in the Balkans.

In the defter of jizya in 1485, Llapi had 5,952 Christian families, while in 1488-1489 Llapi had 7,399 households. In the 18th century the Nahije of Llapi was part of Pristina's Sanjak. At this time, Llapi lost many residents due to two plagues that struck the place. During the Austro-Ottoman war, the Austrian army destroyed and robbed the town twice. Later, the region fought against the Ottomans. During the first Serbian Revolt, the Serbian army got into the village of Reçica and killed 30 people, including Demë Ahmeti, an Albanian national hero who is later mentioned in songs. This happened on 28 June 1811, during the feast of Eid.

A rebellion against the Ottomans arose when Sultan Abdulmejid I proclaimed the Tanzimat reforms in 1839, which increased taxes and brought about many rebellions in Albanian-pupulated lands. The population of Llapi fought against these reforms and, during 1843, the Ottomans temporarily left Llapi to organize its reoccupation. The rebels gathered many soldiers from the surrounding regions and they beat the Ottomans, taking Pristina and encouraging a bigger rebellion in other regions. The rebellion was extinguished in 1847.

When Serbia acquired the Sanjak of Nis in 1877, many Albanians were expelled from their homes in Nis and the surrounding regions, and Llapi was one of their first destinations as they sought refuge in Kosovo. There is not a single village in Podujevo where Muhajirs or migrants cannot be found. Furthermore, they established new villages.

The Albanians of Llapi, since the League of Prizren, refused to pay taxes to the Ottomans. The Ottomans built a military cantonment during 1892 and 1899 as they detected Serbian Army movements near the border.
The Albanian rebellion against Ottomans during 1906 was primarily organized in the Llapi region. Another Albanian rebellion was that of 1910 which also started in the Llapi region. The relationships between the residents and The Sublime Porte were becoming very strained and when Sulltan Mehmed Reshid V came to visit Kosovo and very few Llapi residents were present. Llapi is also known for its cooperation with Isa Boletini, who, during 1911, operated around this zone. Many soldiers from the villages of Llapi and Gallapi promised their loyalty to Isa Boletini in 1912, in the Bradash pledge. Their goal was to initiate the general Albanian rebellion against Ottoman Rule and they were part of the rebellion until it ended.

1912 until World War I 
When the neighbouring countries formed the Balkan Alliance, Albanians felt at risk of being subjugated to these nations. Serbian forces engaged the border region where 16.000 Albanians were placed. The largest battle was fought in Merdare and lasted three days, where the Serbian army had up to 70.000 soldiers.  Soon they took Merdare and the war continued in other fronts. From that time on, the region remained under Serbian control. Llapi remained a region of Pristina. In 1913, Llapi numbered 27,081 residents, while 10 years beforehand, 38,520 residents were present. On 20 August 1914, Serbia announced a decree in which the colonisation of its newly acquired territories was planned. This, and the process of disarmament of the local population, were key factors to the rise of the Kaçak guerilla movement.

World War I and World War II 
During the First World War, most of the Serbian army, led by the Serbian king Peter I, retreated through the Llapi region. During the retreat, war crimes (including robbing, killing and destruction of property) took place. Llapi was later taken by Bulgaria, which, from time to time, organized grain and cattle requisition. Starting from 1916, any people were deported and sent to work in different countries, most of them never returning. After the Bulgarian surrender, Bulgarian soldiers killed a lot of people and robbed many places during their retreat. Albanians would later form their own military formations for a short period of two months.

The region fell to Yugoslavian Kingdom. In the beginning, the Llapi region had 12 municipalities with 27.084 residents. Later, the number of municipalities was reduced. From 1929 to 1941, Podujevo was part of the Morava Banovina of the Kingdom of Yugoslavia; between the two World Wars, Albanians living in the region had no political rights. They were poor and heavily taxed, and corruption was evident in the administration. The main problem, however, was colonization, which Yugoslavia claimed to be agricultural reforms. The Albanian language was not used at all in public administration and schools, Many residents were forced to migrate to Turkey, while their land was given to Serbian and Montenegrin colonists who would eventually take 62% of infields. Even mosques were controlled by the state.

Armed resistance was mostly pushed by Kaçak movements since it was impossible to organize large groups of people. They managed to expel the Serbian colonists, but the consequences were far greater, as in the beginning of 1921 many massacres against the Albanian population would occur. In Sharban, 35 people were killed and 28 houses were burned. In Bellopoja, 40 people were killed and 57 houses were damaged. In Keqekolla, 490 people were killed and 40 houses were burned. In Prapashtica, 1011 people were killed and 80 houses were burned, in Nishevc, 150 heads of cattle were robbed. In Orllan, 14 people were killed, in Kushevica over 12 people were killed, in Repa over 12 people were killed, and in Popova 573 people were killed and 55 houses were burned. In Velikoreka, 2 houses were burned, while in Gerdoc 27 people were killed and 2 houses were burned. In Lupç, 11 people were killed, and in Lepaja, 5 houses were burned. Justin Godard, at the Paris Peace Conference defended “the rights of life for the Albanian population.”.

From 1912 to 1918, around 8,000 Albanians were forced to leave their lands to migrate to Turkey, while during 1920–1924,280 Albanian families were also forced to leave. In contrast, 420 Slavic families were settled in the territory between 1920 and 1928,
and by 1932, 3,474ha of land were given to colonists and 756 houses were built.

During World War II, Llapi was taken by the German army. The residents of Llapi did not submit to Serbian conscription and fled to the mountains. Germany captured Podujevo with an army including two tanks. Under the German administration, this region was called Llapi's nenprefektura. Albanians requested that the authorities unify Albanian-inhabited regions under one administration, but this did not occur. During that time, all of Llapi had 42,942 residents. At the end of World War II, Serbia, Germany and Bulgaria were struggling for control of the town. There were greater numbers of military troops around Podujevo than there were residents. The residents later fled to Pristina in a 5 km convoy during October 1944. Earlier, the Germans gave Jahja Fusha authority of the town. 5,000 Albanian soldiers fought to protect the town against Serbians and Bulgarians alike. The fighting ended on 8 November 1944, after a long battle. The residents were required to come back to the town, and afterwards, some 500 men were killed without trial.  10 places are recorded to be mass graveyards. Starting from December 1994, Albanians were conscripted and sent to fight in other part of Yugoslavia.

Serbian Rule 

After World War II, the Llapi region was under Serbian Rule. Serbian administration collected 11,297,067 dinars under the guise of it being a punishment for the illegal enrichment of some locals.
During 1950–1955, the Serbians founded many directorates. When the constitution of 1963 was approved, the municipalities were in a better situation. In 1966, Podujevo had 58,604 citizens. These improvements were ruined by Serbian authorities in 1990. Prior to this, Yugoslavia's five-year plan of 1981-1985 did not offer a viable solution to the economic problems of the region's residents.

During 1981–1991, 51 ethnic Albanian soldiers were wrongfully murdered during their service in the Yugoslavian army. The most notable event of the period was the demonstration of 1981, organized in Pristina, that was later followed by massive demonstrations all around Kosovo. The town of Podujevo was locked down at this time except for the Medical Center. The route near the border was blocked, and so was the route to Pristina. Some local police were shot while driving tanks. Thousands of people were imprisoned.

Under Serbian control, Albanians were organized into several political parties such as “NDSh”, or Albanian National Democratic Party, the Albanian Youth National Democratic Committee, The Albanian League and so on. Demonstrations were organized in March 1989 and 1990. During this period, many workers were fired from their jobs and funding for educational institutions was halted. This continued for a while, but Albanians had organized private funds themselves so that the education process would not stop. During 1989–1997, 22 people were killed in the region. These actions motivated the Albanian populations to resolve their societal disputes. During 1990–1992, 114 bloodfeud issues and 60 other disputes were resolved.

Modern history 
In 1997, the Kosovo Liberation Army was formed, prompting Slobodan Milosevic to start a brutal campaign against it during 1998. During the Kosovo War (1998–1999), the town was the site of the Podujevo massacre, on March 28, in which 14 Kosovo Albanian women and children were executed by Serbian paramilitary forces. After the Kosovo War, the process of establishing a Municipal Assembly began in 2002. Later, on 17 February 2008, Kosovo declared its independence.

Podujevo is now known for its cattle trade and for its battlefields during the Kosovo War. Podujevo is not one of the major cities of Kosovo, but it has the potential to bring in tourists from around Kosovo and elsewhere for its scenic mountains and Lake Batlava.

The road coming into Podujevo from the city of Niš was the site of the 2001 Podujevo bus bombing, in which a bus carrying Serb pilgrims traveling to the Gračanica monastery site was bombed. Twelve Serb pilgrims were killed and dozens more were injured by the bomb-blast. Kosovo Albanian extremists have been blamed for the attack.

Geography 

Podujevo is located in the northeastern corner of Kosovo, situated near a regional motorway and railroad which links it to surrounding regions. It consists of Llapi's Hollow and the Albanik mountains in the west, and eastern Kosovo's mountains in the east. Llapi's valley is placed between the village of Repa and that of Barileva with a 35 km distance and between Batllava and Llapashtica e Eperme with 12–15 km. Llapi's jaw is located between Repa and Murgulla (14 km) and from Bellasica to Uglar's Cape (14 km). Gallapi is placed between Batllava and Metergoc in latitude and from Turiqica to Koliq in longitude. Podujevo is the largest municipality of Kosovo since it covers 633 km2. Since its territory is compact, it represents a microgeographical entirety.

Hydrology 

Podujevo counts several ravines, water springs and rivers. The most notable river is Lab, the main branch of Sitnica, which runs through the middle of Podujevo, springing from the Albanik mountains. The source of Lab is considered to be the Polata village where the rivers of Murgula and Slatina are joined. In the upper part of it, the river runs through steep places but when it enter Lab's hollow, its speed is moderated. Lab river is 82.7 km long up to Sitnica river while most of the river passes through Podujevo's lands, in a 61 km length. This river is wide from 9 to 12 meters and deep up to 1.2 meters. The river brings an average of 4.9 m3 per second, however, there are considerable variations with the maximum going up to 25 m3 per second.
 
There are other rivers also. Dumnica river is 25.5 km long and fills 87 km2 and it is used for irrigating. Kaqanolli river is Llapi's most important right branch and it is 32.5 km long, filling 193.6 km2. Batlava river fills 315 km2 and it also flows into Llapi. In 1965 a cascade 40.5 m high was built in order to form an artificial lake — the Batlava Lake, which can handle up to 40 million m3 of water and was primary built for ECK needs, to be used later for consuming purposes.

Climate 

The climate in Podujevo belongs to the continental zone but alike, it is colder than in other parts of Kosovo. The average temperature in Podujevo is 9.6 ̊C. The amplitude is 64.2 ̊C.

The average snow fal l days are 26  while days with snow mantle are 48.4. The maximum layer of snow is recorded to be 96 cm while the month with a maximum of snow mantle days is February with 11.7 days. The length of the day in Podujeva varies significantly over the course of the year. In 2022, the shortest day is December 21, with 9 hours, 1 minute of daylight; the longest day is June 21, with 15 hours, 21 minutes of daylight.

Flora and Fauna 

Podujevo counts 29,050 acres of forests most of whom are located in the western and northern part of its territory. 17,600 ha are under state control and the rest (11.450) are under private control. Since the woods remain the main warming option of Kosovars, degradation and wood cuts remain a challenge.
The trees which are found in this zone include: beech (fagus sylvatica), hornbeam (carpinus orientalis) and ash-tree. In alluvial lands osier and poplar may be found but other trees are found also.
There may be found bushes such as cornel bush (Cornus Mas), haw (crataegus monogyna), canker-rose (rosa canina), elder  (sambocus nigra),  gooseberry  (prunus spicosa), hazelnut (corylus avellana) etc.
The forests of Podujevo contain wolves (canis lupus), rabbits (lepus europaeus), foxes,  gray bears, wild pigs and other mammals. From the birds there may be found pigeons (Columbia livia), laraska (pica pica), crow, flicker (dryobates major) etc.
In rivers, water snake (natrix natrix), rock snake (vipera ammodytes) and random turtle (testudo bermanni) are found.

Natural Monuments 

In Podujevo, there are a number of natural monuments which were recognized as valuable resources. The list includes:

Demographics

According to the 2001 census, the urban population is estimated to consist of 23.453 citizens. The rural population lives in 77 villages with a total number of 65.046 residents. From the overall population, Albanians are 87.523, Ashkali 680, Roma 75, Bosniaks 33, Serbs 12, Turks 5, Egyptians 2 and 43 are not specified. 98% of residents are Muslim.

The town has a low ratio of internal migration but a high rate of commuting. The illiteracy rate is lower than 5%. The average years of schooling is 9.0 to 9.2. The labor force is smaller than 40.1%, with an employment rate of 20.1% and unemployment rate of between 45 and 51%. The average size of the households is between 6 and 7%.

Settlements 

Podujevo has 77 settlements comprising 65,046 inhabitants. 73.49% reside in villages while 23,453 inhabitants live in urban areas.

Economy 

The biggest expansion on the economy of Podujevo occurred during the 1980s. At that time, there were 16 social organizations that have developed their economic activities, with altogether 2.500 employees. The beginning of the 1990s is characterized with a growing of private businesses, in particular in trade and services. During the war of 1999 all of these businesses were destroyed by Serbian military forces, so the period of renewal was long and difficult. After the war, the private sector was the main bearer of economical development with a continual growth. According to the Businesses Office, there are around 3.122 registered businesses, mostly in trade section.

Agriculture 

Podujevo is mostly a rural area. Podujevo has extraordinary resources regarding the agriculture field, since there are sufficient lands and water. Historically, the agriculture was cultivated only for family needs, as it has been considered as a secondary sector, but recently it has begun to be used also for other needs and requests, which could be beneficial and profitable. Other relevant sectors which belong to the agriculture, are: farming, beekeeping, poultry, vegetable, arboriculture, land cultivation, and so forth. Podujeva is especially known for cultivating raspberries, as the climate is perfect for its growth.

Mining 

From the most common minerals extracted for industrial usage are silicates (Si), carbonates (Ch), gravel (Gs), clay (Cl), nickel (Nl), lead (Pb) zinc (Zn) and aluminum (Al). There is no clear data regarding to the quantity of these reserves.* There are two companies who use surface mineral resources, one in Murgulla and the other one in Turuqica.

Industry 

After the 1999, the development of the secondary sector or industry is accompanied with the development of small and medium enterprises in the production field. Currently, the industry plays an important role in the economical development of Podujevo. There are 116 industrial buildings with 290 employees. Former public enterprises have been privatized. Some of the most important enterprises include: Construction Armory Factory “FAN”, Brick Factory “Euro Block”, Recycling Enterprise “Plastika”, Factory for processing mushrooms “Agro-Product”, Factory for production of juices “Dona”, Factory for production of juices and vegetable oil “Pajtimi Company”, etc.

Trade 

Trade take an important place in all businesses from the percentage of participation of enterprises and employees with 53%. Considering some strategic elements, as nearness of the urban center Pristina, streets with national character, and the others advantages have made the trade sector dominant in the last 10 years. In Podujevo, there are 1316 businesses registered, and in total 3290 employees.

Infrastructure 

The water supply system in Podujevo dates back to 1956. Given that a part of the supply system is aging, considerable investments are being made to improve it. The water supply fulfills the standards of the World Health Organization, though Podujevo sometimes faces water shortages. Podujevo is supplied with water from two sources; firstly, from the water factory in Shajkoc in which the water comes through with a pipe of 8.22 km and secondly, from the pumping system of Peran. In Podujevo, the canalization system is 86.33 km long with roughly 56000 residents being the recipient. Most of the black waters of canalization system flows into Llapi river with no prior intervention, while there is no sprinkler.

Podujevo counts 1225.2 km of roads covering 497.7 acres. This includes highway, regional, local and uncategorized roads. While some roads still remain without asphalt, 92.7% of the residents have access to the highroads and 76.89% have access to highways and regional roads.

The railway network in Podujevo links Kosovo to Serbia. It is 22 km long and 10 settlements are linked directly to this railroad. 45.08% of Podujevo's citizens also have direct access to it. As of 2010, this railway is inoperative.

There are 102 bridges in Podujevo, 96 of whom belong to roadways and the other 6 belong to railways. From the bridges in the roadway, 6 are in highways, 9 in regional roads, and the rest are found in local and uncategorized roads. Also, there is a subway in Merdare which is 1500 m long and belongs to the railway network.

The public transport in Podujevo is organized through buses, small buses and other vehicles since there are many villages. Since some of the villages are in deep areas of Podujevo and they have a small number of residents, they do not have access to  public transportation.

Podujevo is supplied with electric energy through Pristina line with a capacity of 220 kW and from Mazgit line with a capacity of 35 kW. Other lines also pass through Podujevo's territory, but they have international connection purposes such as the 400 kW line which goes to Niš. All of Podujevo's citizens have access to electricity. 66 settlements have a normal distribution and the remaining 12 do not. Public lighting covers 4150 m in urban areas. This network covers these roads: “Zahir Pajaziti”, “28 nëntori”, “Hakif Zejnullahu”, “Skenderbeu” and “Abdyl Lahu”.

Tourism 
Podujevo has its potentials concerning the tourism. It is characterized by many and various potentials for development of weekend and rural tourism as well. The geomorphology of Podujevo territory is quite rich. Two massive mountains, such as Albaniku and Gollaku mountains are located in Podujevo. Moreover, Llapi valley together with Lab river, and the Batlava Lake provide incontestable values regarding the tourism.

One of the tourist places is the Batlava Lake.
During the summer season this lake attracts thousand of visitors around Kosovo, who come to spend holidays in spaces, as beaches which are offered there. Batlava has six beaches in good condition. These beaches offer spaces for familiar relaxation, which provide the visitors with sandy football and volleyball grounds, and also playgrounds for children. Parkings, floors, umbrellas, sunshades, boats and seats are available around the lake. Other important values which can be found in Podujevo are cultural heritage monuments, created in certain historic periods. The most outstanding monument is the fortress of the national martyr and hero Zahir Pajaziti.

Among architectural and cultural monuments of local and national importance are also: Two towers in Hertica, the one of Sali Aga and Ajet Muçolli, Complex in Reçica, the Monument of Tabet Llapashtica, House Museum of the national martyr Hasan Ramadani, and the Tower of Demë Ahmeti. According to the Institutional for Protection of Kosovo Monuments, the number of monuments in Podujevo is around 60.

Education 

Podujevo manages 68 educational objects, including 39 schools. There is only one Daycare Center namely "DRITA", 35 primary schools and 3 high schools. 24 Settlements do not have a school at all. There are 1549 people working in the educational system, while the number of students is 23.811 which means that there is a teacher for every 18.24 students.

The condition of the schools is not in the good state since 14 school are in a poor position, while 24 schools need some of basic investments. Seven schools work in three tours while the rest work into or one tour. Is worth mentioning that there is a school in Gllamnik named "Kongresi i Manastirit", which offers a special class for people with disabilities which has 27 students and 2 teachers.

Health 

The medical object which operates in Podujevo, includes the main Center of Family Healthcare, 14 family healthcare centers and 7 ambulances. About 246 people operate on these services. The average distance from a settlement to a healthcare institution is 0–3 km, while the largest distance is 8 km. After the 1999 war, WHO, IBRD and European Union helped the health system. During 2008, 525.866 medical services had been offered by Republic medical system. In the private sector there are 25 medical institutions, mostly found in the urban area. These belong to small ordinances,  which offer specialize services.

Culture 

Podujevo's residents have shown a high interest to contribute for culture, although they did not have the proper conditions to participate. In fact, the requirements for fulfillment of various cultural and art projects are higher in comparison with the conditions offered by the Management of Culture, Youth and Sport. The lack of space and adequate infrastructure have impacted the development of cultural life.

A number of organizations and artistic associations focused on drama, comedy, sporting competitions and other cultural activities are located in Podujevo. These activities are organized in the city theater, sport hall with only 800 seats, city stadium, and city library, though there is insufficient space. The city theater has been the most common place of several cultural activities and exhibitions, which has become popular in Podujevo and elsewhere. It was established in 1994. To date, it is the city's most successful artistic institution with major events taking place throughout the year.

The dancing ensemble called “The Downtown Dancers”, founded in 2002, are an important part of the cultural life in Podujevo. The group performs traditional folk dances and modern dances. The ensemble has performed internationally along with some folk festivals in Kosovo, and has 50 members.

Prior to 1999, the Municipality of Podujevo had a total of 14 public libraries with 143.067 books. During the war period of 1999, 10 libraries were burned by Serb forces, including the city library which contained 124.977 books. After 1999, the municipality had only three libraries with around 18.090 books, though not in good condition. The fund of these copies are mainly in the Albanian language, and a small part consists in the English and German language. Besides the city library, there are two other libraries, one located in Orllan, whereas the other one is in Lluzhan.

There are no local newspapers published in Podujevo. However, there are two radio stations, both of which were founded in 2000. These local radio stations are "Vision Radio" and "Llap Radio".

Cultural-Artistic Society “Josip Rela” 

The Cultural-Artistic Society “Josip Rela” is a main contributor to the culture of Podujevo. This dancing association was founded in 1966 and has represented Podujevo in different competitions. Its first initiator for the forming of this dramatic group was Bislim Aliu. Some of the famous members of the group were Dr. Abdullah Vokrri, Dr. Rifat Blaku, Mr. Bislim Aliu, Skënder Hyseni, along with others. “Josip Rela” has won a considerable number of prizes.

“Teatri Ndryshe” 

The culture of Podujevo is also characterized through different festivals. One of these festivals is the "Teatri Ndryshe" International Festival. This festival was launched in 2009 and takes place during the summer. It is organized by the Management of Culture, Youth and Sport in Podujevo. Various theatrical groups from Kosovo, Albania, Romania, Bosnia and Herzegovina, and other regional countries participate in this festival with their performances. "Teatri Ndryshe" usually is organized in the city theater and city square.

Festival of Literature in Orllan 

Another popular and well-known festival not only in Podujevo, but in Kosovo as well, is the international Festival of Literature in Orllan. The Literature Festival was established in 2011 by the Batlava Lake, in order to unite various Kosovar artists, writers, musicians, and other artists from regional countries. Writers from the UK, Cyprus, Japan and Syria also take part in the daily sessions. The festival also offers live music performances.

Sports 

Podujevo is known for its sporting tradition. Athletes from Podujevo have gone on to play for Kosovar teams as well as international clubs. In the early 1930s horse racing was a popular sport. Horse racing competitions were held under the patronage of the Fusha family. Jahja Fusha, the-then mayor of the municipality was regarded as a formidable athlete.

The first football team was founded in 1928, and was named "Sloga". However, its existence was brief as it folded in 1931. KF Llapi is the oldest football club in Podujevo and it was founded in 1932 as a member of the Niš Football Subassociation. Its prominent footballers included Fadil Vokrri among others. In 2014 it became a part of the Football Superleague of Kosovo.

There are two major football stadiums in Podujevo. Zahir Pajaziti Stadium  hosts KF Llapo and holds 2000 seats. The other is located in Merdare, and has a capacity of 5000; it hosted the former club KF Hysi. Other smaller clubs also exist.

Twin towns – sister cities

Podujevo is twinned with:
 Velbert, Germany
 Linz, Austria
 Kestel, Turkey

Notable people

Adem Demaçi (1936–2018), Kosovo Albanian writer and former politician
Agon Mehmeti (b. 1989), Albanian footballer
Arlind Ajeti (b. 1993), Albanian footballer
Debatik Curri (b. 1984), Albanian footballer
Dragan Maksimović (1949–2001), Serbian actor
Fadil Vokrri (1960–2018), footballer
Fatmir Sejdiu (b. 1951), former President of Kosovo
Granit Xhaka  (b. 1992), Swiss footballer
Jashar Erebara  (b. 1873), rilindas, journalist
Taulant Xhaka  (b. 1991), Albanian footballer 
Vlora Çitaku  (b. 1980), Kosovar Albanian politician and diplomat
Xhavit Bajrami (b. 1975), Albanian kick boxer
Zahir Pajaziti (1962–1997), founding member of the Kosovo Liberation Army (KLA)

Annotations

References

Bibliography 
 Komuna e Podujevës (2012): "Plani Lokal i Veprimit në Mjedis 2012-2017". Rrjeti, Pristina.
 Agjencia e Kosovës për Mbrojtjen e Mjedisit, Instituti për Mbrojtjen e Natyrës së Kosovës (August 2004): "Raport nga Rekognosimi i Terrenit në Territorin e Komunës së Podujevës", "Bill Clinton" st., Pristina.
 Komuna e Podujevës (2010): "Strategjia e Zhvillimit Ekonomik Lokal 2011-2014". Pristina.
 Komuna e Podujevës (2010): "Plani Zhvillimor Komunal". Gis Consulting, Podujevo.
 Pushkolli, Fehmi (1998): "Llapi gjatë historisë", Interpress R. Company, Pristina.
 Agjencia e Statistikave të Kosovës (2011): "Kosovo Census Atlas", Pristina. .
 Komuna e Podujevës (2011): “Plani Zhvillimor Urban (2011-2021)”, Gis Consulting, Podujevo.
 Komuna e Podujevës (2011): “Plani Investiv në Infrastrukturën e Ujësjellësit dhe Kanalizimit në Komunën e Podujevës”. Podujevo.
 Komuna e Podujevës: “Zhvillimi, përmirësimi dhe promovimi I turizmit në Liqenin e Batllavës”. Fotostudio NIKON, Podujevë.

External links 

 Municipality of Podujevo (Republic of Serbia)
 Municipality of Podujevo (Republic of Kosovo)
 Podujevo 

Kosovo–Serbia border crossings
Municipalities of Kosovo
Cities in Kosovo